Number One most commonly refers to:

 1 (number)

Number One, No. 1, or #1 may also refer to:

Music

Albums 

 Number 1 (Big Bang album), and the title song
 No. 1 (BoA album), and the title song
 No.1 (EP), by CLC
 n.1 (David Carreira album)
 #1 (Fischerspooner album)
 Number One (Billie Godfrey album), and the title song
 #1 (Linda Király album)
 Number One (Pist.On album)
 Number One (M Trill album)
 Number One (My Chemical Romance EP)
 No1 (Nikolija album)
 Number 1 (O-Zone album), and the title song
 Number One (Racine album)
 Number One (Sanchez album)
 #1 (Stacy album)
 No. 1 (Teen Top album)
 The Beatles (No. 1), by the Beatles
 #1, by Felix

Songs 

 "No.1" (BoA song)
 "No.1" (Uverworld song)
 "Numba 1" (Tide Is High), by Kardinal Offishall
 "Number 1" (Goldfrapp song)
 "Number 1" (Tinchy Stryder song)
 "Number One" (Alexia song)
 "Number One" (John Legend song)
 "Number One" (Pharrell Williams song)
 "Number One" (R. Kelly song)
 "Number One" (Skye Sweetnam song)
 "#1" (Nelly song)
 "#1", by Animal Collective
 "#1", by Imagine Dragons from Mercury – Act 1
 "#1", by Kelly Rowland from Talk a Good Game
 "No. 1", from the television series Tweenies
 "Number 1", by Big Bang from Number 1
 "Number One", by A from How Ace Are Buildings
 "Number One", by Al Lindsay from the Thrillville: Off the Rails in-game soundtrack
 "Number One", by Chaz Jankel from Looking at You
 "Number One", by E.Y.C. from Express Yourself Clearly
 "Number One", by Gentle Giant from Civilian
 "Number One", by Heavenly from Coming from the Sky
 "Number One", by Helloween from Pink Bubbles Go Ape
 "Number One", by Jamie Foxx from Intuition
 "Number One", by Lower Than Atlantis from the self-titled album
 "Number One", by Playgroup
 "Number One", by The Rutles
 "Number One", by Tadpole from The Buddhafinger
 "Number 1", by Loona from [#]
 "Numero Uno", by Starlight

Films and television 
 Number One (1969 film), a film starring Charlton Heston
 Number One (1973 film), an Italian language film
 Number One (1994 film), a Telugu film
 Number One (2017 film), a French film
 Number 1 (2020 film), a Singaporean film
 Number One (video), a 2005 video by Greek singer Elena Paparizou
 Number One Shakib Khan a Bangladeshi film
 Don Number One, a Bangladeshi film
 Tiger Number One, a Bangladeshi film
 Boss Number One, a Bangladeshi film
 "Number One", an episode of My Name Is Earl
 El Número Uno, a Spanish TV talent show

Characters
 Number One (Artemis Fowl), a demon character in the Artemis Fowl novel series
 Number One (Babylon 5), a recurring character in the TV series Babylon 5
 Number One (Golgafrinchan), a character from The Hitchhiker's Guide to the Galaxy by Douglas Adams
 Number One (The Prisoner), a character in the television series The Prisoner
 Number One (Star Trek), the nickname of the Enterprise second-in-command character in the first pilot episode of Star Trek and its spin-offs Star Trek: Discovery and Star Trek: Strange New Worlds
 "Number One", Captain Picard's frequent way of addressing William Riker in Star Trek: The Next Generation
 Number One, Picard's pit bull in Star Trek: Picard
 John Cavil (Number One), a character in the reimagined version of Battlestar Galactica
 Ernst Stavro Blofeld (Number 1), chief of SPECTRE in James Bond novels and films
 Number One, a character in the novel series H.I.V.E. by Mark Walden
 Number One, the head of the Stonecutters in the Simpsons episode "Homer the Great"
 Numbuh 1, leader of Sector V, from Codename: Kids Next Door

Other
 No 1 (Royal Red and Blue), a 1954 painting by Mark Rothko
 No. 1 (yacht), assisted by an electric motor that gets its electricity from hydrogen fuel cells
 Number 1 (painting), by Jackson Pollock
 Number One (guitar)
 Number One (magazine), a UK music magazine
 Number One (Royal Navy)
 Number One, Kentucky, a community in the United States
 Number 1, a slang term for urination
 No. 1 (or variants), the top spot, or a song or album reaching the top spot, on any record chart
 Number 1, a book by Billy Martin and Peter Golenbock
 Rifle, Number 1, a British rifle
 Ruger No. 1, an American rifle
 Shakib Khan, Bangladeshi actor popularly referred as Number one Shakib Khan (initialism as No1SK)

See also 
 One (disambiguation)
 My Number One (disambiguation)
 Looking Out for Number One (disambiguation)
 Number 1's (disambiguation)
 Number Two (disambiguation)